Electric Wizard is the debut studio album by English doom metal band Electric Wizard released in 1994 through Rise Above Records and re-released bundled with their second album, Come My Fanatics... in 1999. A remastered version was then released on CD and LP in 2006, with two bonus tracks, taken from a demo entitled Doom Chapter.

History 
The origins of Electric Wizard go back to 1988 when Jus Oborn formed the band Lord of Putrefaction. They put out three demo tapes from 1989–1991 and also did one split with Mortal Remains. In 1992, the name was changed to Thy Grief Eternal after Adam Richardson left the band. They put out one demo under this name titled On Blackened Wings. In 1993, James Evans left the band and they once again changed their name, shortening it to Eternal. The band released two demos under this name. After Gavin Gillingham left the band, Oborn started Electric Wizard.  The recordings from this era were issued on the Pre-Electric Wizard 1989–1994 compilation in 2006.

Electric Wizard began in Wimborne in Dorset, England during 1993, and was composed of guitarist-vocalist Jus Oborn, bassist Tim Bagshaw, and drummer Mark Greening. The band's name was taken from two Black Sabbath songs: "Electric Funeral" and "The Wizard".  Oborn remarked, "Is the name Electric Wizard made out of two Black Sabbath song titles? (smokes a big bud of weed through a can) Hahahaha, yeah it is!"

In 1994 the band released the album through Rise Above Records.

Critical reception 

Electric Wizard received mostly positive reviews from music critics, with Eduardo Rivadavia of Allmusic writing "When Electric Wizard first emerged, seemingly fully formed from the hallowed wombs of the doom metal gods (well, Dorset, England, anyway), all most listeners could do was stand in dumbfounded awe -- such was the power and magnitude with which the trio delivered its monolithic epics. Taking up the torch from doom pioneers like Saint Vitus, Sleep, and more recently Britain's own Cathedral, the eternally stoned-out trio went about setting a new standard for slothful, detuned heavy metal noisemaking; yet -- amazingly, compared to subsequent efforts -- their eponymous debut's crushing wall of sludge would soon seem almost lightweight. Most of the songs on Electric Wizard crawl along at a snail's pace, their mind-numbing riffs exploring the lowest imaginable sonic frequencies still within human range. Except for the trippy space rock guitar of "Mountains of Mars," the entire record revels in the purest, uncompromising post-Sabbath doom metal dirge, a great part of which may prove too sluggish and impenetrable for inexperienced listeners. But for knowledgeable consumers of the genre, weed-worshipping anthems like "Stone Magnet," "Devil's Bride," and the group's awesome namesake, "Electric Wizard" (which is introduced by a long, highly suspicious exhaled breath), amount to a mind-shattering experience...prepare to be enlightened."

Artwork 
The album cover depicts a woman riding a winged seahorse across a psychedelic ocean floor, which has been decorated with stone statues. The font used for the logo is the same style used for Black Sabbath's self-titled album, a nod to one of the band's inspirations.

Track listing 
All tracks by Jus Oborn.

Original

Japanese edition bonus track

Bonus songs on 2006 reissue

Personnel 
 Jus Oborn – guitar, vocals
 Tim Bagshaw – bass
 Mark Greening – drums
 All Lyrics: Jus Oborn
 All Music: Electric Wizard

Release history

References 

1994 debut albums
Electric Wizard albums
Rise Above Records albums
Candlelight Records albums